The Institute of International Education in conjunction with the United_States_International_University_Africa coordinate the fellowships of over 300 African-born academics in North America. Funding for this project is by the Carnegie Corporation of New York. The strategic direction is through Dr. Paul Tiyambe Zeleza and an Advisory Council.

External links
 

 Closer Look: Georgia Professor Selected to Conduct Research in Nigeria; Synthetic Marijuana; And More WABE June 28, 2018

Educational organizations based in Africa
African culture